Somayya Anwar Jabarti (born ) is the first woman editor-in-chief of a Saudi Arabian national newspaper, Saudi Gazette.

Somayya has reported on a spectrum of subjects from women’s issues to the stepping down of former Egyptian President Hosni Mubarak. She was the only Saudi reporter on the ground in the midst of the revolution in Tahrir Square.

Selected as one of the BBC 100 Women List in 2015, Jabarti was listed as one of Arabian Business Top 100 Most Powerful Arab Women in 2014 and 2015 and among Alarabiya's Top 10 Muslim women in 2014

References 

Living people
Saudi Arabian newspaper editors
1970s births
BBC 100 Women
Saudi Arabian translators